Robert Allen Palmer (19 January 1949 – 26 September 2003) was an English singer and songwriter. He was known for his powerful, soulful voice and sartorial elegance, and for his stylistic explorations, combining soul, funk, jazz, rock, pop, reggae, and blues. While his "four-decade career incorporated every genre of music", Palmer is best known "for the pounding rock-soul classic, 'Addicted to Love', and its accompanying video, which came to epitomise the glamour and excesses of the 1980s."

Having started in the music industry in the 1960s, including a spell with Vinegar Joe, he found success in the 1980s, both in his solo career and with the Power Station, scoring Top 10 hits in the United Kingdom and the United States. Three of his hit singles, including "Addicted to Love", featured music videos directed by British fashion photographer Terence Donovan.

Palmer received a number of awards throughout his career, including two Grammy Awards for Best Male Rock Vocal Performance and an MTV Video Music Award. He was also nominated by the Brit Award for Best British Male Solo Artist. He died at age 54, following a heart attack.

Career

1964–1973: Early bands
Palmer was born in 1949 in Batley, Yorkshire.  When he was only a few months old, he moved with his family to Malta, where his father worked in British naval intelligence.  He was influenced as a child by blues, soul, and jazz music on American Forces Radio and by his parents' musical tastes. His family returned to the UK when he was 12.

In his teens, Palmer moved to Scarborough, Yorkshire. He joined his first band, the Mandrakes, at the age of 15 while still at Scarborough High School for Boys. He left school the following year to briefly study art at Scarborough School of Art & Design, before landing a job at the Scarborough Evening News. He was reportedly fired after police found "the stub of a cannabis joint in a raid on his bedsit".

Palmer's first major break came with the departure of singer Jess Roden from the band The Alan Bown Set in 1969, after which Palmer was invited to London to sing on the band's single "Gypsy Girl". The vocals for the album The Alan Bown!, originally recorded by Roden (and released in the US that way), were re-recorded by Palmer after the success of the single. According to music journalist Paul Lester, Palmer rose from northern clubs in England to become "elegant and sophisticated" and the master of several styles.

In 1970, he joined the 12-piece jazz-rock fusion band Dada, which featured singer Elkie Brooks and her husband Pete Gage. After a year, Palmer, Brooks, and Gage formed soul/rock band Vinegar Joe. Palmer played rhythm guitar in the band, and shared lead vocals with Brooks. Signed to the Island Records label, the band released three albums: Vinegar Joe (1972), Rock 'n' Roll Gypsies (1972), and Six Star General (1973), before disbanding in March 1974. Brooks later said Palmer "was a very good-looking guy", and that female fans were happy to find that Brooks and Palmer were not romantically linked.

1974–1978: Early solo career
Island Records signed Palmer to a solo deal in 1974. His first solo album, Sneakin' Sally Through the Alley, recorded in 1974 in New Orleans, Louisiana, was heavily influenced by the music of Little Feat and the funk fusion of the Meters, who acted as the backing band along with producer/guitarist Lowell George of Little Feat. Unsuccessful in the UK, both the album and single reached the top 100 in the US. Notably, "Sailin' Shoes" (the album's first track, and a Little Feat cover), Palmer's own "Hey Julia", and the Allen Toussaint-penned title track carry virtually the same rhythm, and were packaged on the album as a "trilogy" without a pause between them.

After relocating with his wife to New York City, Palmer released Pressure Drop, named for the cover version of the reggae hit by Toots and the Maytals, in November 1975 (featuring Motown bassist James Jamerson). He toured with Little Feat to promote the reggae- and rock-infused album.

With the failure of follow-up album Some People Can Do What They Like, Palmer decided to move to Nassau, Bahamas, directly across the street from Compass Point Studios.

In 1978, he released Double Fun, a collection of Caribbean-influenced rock, including a cover of "You Really Got Me". The album reached the top 50 on the US Billboard chart and scored a top 20 single with the Andy Fraser-penned "Every Kinda People". The song has been covered by other artists including Chaka Demus and Pliers, Randy Crawford, the Mint Juleps (produced by Trevor Horn), and Amy Grant. It reached number 16 on the Billboard Hot 100.

1979–1984: Growing mainstream success
Palmer's next album was an artistic departure, concentrating on pure rock. 1979's Secrets produced his second top 20 single with Moon Martin's "Bad Case of Loving You (Doctor, Doctor)". The number 14 hit also gave Palmer his second Billboard Hot 100 year-end chart hit. The following year saw the release of Clues, produced by Palmer and featuring Chris Frantz and Gary Numan, which generated hits on both sides of the Atlantic, first with the radio-friendly single "Johnny and Mary" and then "Looking for Clues". Catchy music videos matching the synth-pop stylings of new wave gave him much-needed exposure to a younger audience. The success was repeated with the 1982 EP release of Some Guys Have All the Luck. As he settled into the 1980s, Palmer's increasing commercial success as a performer fuelled his work as a producer, including on Jamaican ska legend Desmond Dekker's 1981 album Compass Point. A few years later, he helped Island label-mate John Martyn in the production of his album, Sapphire.

April 1983 saw the release of Pride. While not as commercially successful as Clues, it featured the title song and Palmer's cover of the System's "You Are in My System", with the System's David Frank on keyboards. On 31 May 1983, Palmer's concert at the Hammersmith Palais was recorded and broadcast on BBC Radio 1. On 23 July 1983, Palmer performed at Duran Duran's charity concert at Aston Villa football ground, where he struck up friendships with members of Duran Duran that would spawn the supergroup the Power Station.

1985–1989: The Power Station and MTV success
When Duran Duran went on hiatus, guitarist Andy Taylor and bassist John Taylor joined former Chic drummer Tony Thompson and Palmer to form the Power Station. Their eponymous album, recorded mainly at the New York recording studio after which the band was named, with overdubs and mixing at Compass Point Studios in Nassau, Bahamas, reached the top 20 in the UK and the top 10 in the US. It spawned two hit singles with "Some Like It Hot" (US number 6) and a cover of the T. Rex song "Get It On (Bang a Gong)", which peaked one position higher than the original at US number 9. Palmer performed live with the band only once that year, on Saturday Night Live. The band toured, and played Live Aid, with singer Michael Des Barres after Palmer bowed out at the last moment to go back into the recording studio to further his solo career.

Some critics described Palmer's abandonment of the tour as unprofessional. In Number One magazine, he countered the claims that he joined the band for money: "Firstly, I didn't need the money and, secondly the cash was a long time coming. It wasn't exactly an experience that set me up for retirement." He also was accused of ripping off the Power Station sound for his own records. He responded, "Listen, I gave the Power Station that sound. They took it from me, not the other way around."

Riptide and move to EMI
Palmer recorded the album Riptide at Compass Point Studios in 1985, recruiting Thompson and Andy Taylor to play on some tracks plus Power Station record producer Bernard Edwards, who worked with Thompson in Chic, to helm the production. Riptide featured the single "Addicted to Love", which reached number 1 in the United States and number 5 in the United Kingdom. The single was accompanied by a memorable and much-imitated music video, directed by Terence Donovan, in which Palmer is surrounded by a bevy of near-identically clad, heavily made-up female models simulating musicians.  Donovan also directed videos for the hits "Simply Irresistible" and "I Didn't Mean to Turn You On".  In September 1986, Palmer performed "Addicted to Love" at the 1986 MTV Video Music Awards in Los Angeles. In 1987, he won the Grammy Award for Best Male Rock Vocal Performance for "Addicted to Love". At the 1987 Brit Awards, Palmer received his first nomination for Best British Male.

Another single from Riptide, his cover of Cherrelle's "I Didn't Mean to Turn You On", also performed well (US number 2, UK number 9). Another song, "Trick Bag", was written by one of his major influences, New Orleans jazz artist Earl King.

Concerned about the rising crime rate in Nassau, and having landed a deal with EMI, Palmer moved to Lugano, Switzerland in 1987 and set up his own recording studio. Producing Heavy Nova in 1988, Palmer again returned to experimenting, this time with bossa nova rhythms, heavy rock and white-soul balladeering. He repeated his previous success of "Addicted to Love" with the video of "Simply Irresistible", again with a troupe of female "musicians". The song reached number 2 in the US and was Palmer's final top ten hit there. The ballad "She Makes My Day" also proved to be a hit in the UK, peaking at number 6. In 1989, he won a second Grammy for "Simply Irresistible", which would later be featured in the Tony Award-winning musical Contact. At the 1989 Brit Awards, Palmer received his second nomination for Best British Male, and "Simply Irresistible" was nominated for Best British Single. Rolling Stone magazine voted Palmer the best-dressed rock star for 1990.

1990s: Continued success
Palmer expanded his range even further for his next album, Don't Explain (1990). It featured two UK top 10 hits with covers of Bob Dylan's "I'll Be Your Baby Tonight" (a collaboration with UB40) and Marvin Gaye's "Mercy Mercy Me". Throughout the 1990s, Palmer ventured further into diverse material. The 1992 album Ridin' High was a tribute to the Tin Pan Alley era.

In 1994, Palmer released Honey to mixed reviews. While the album failed to produce any hit singles in the US, he did find success in the UK with the release of three modest hit singles "Girl U Want", "Know by Now," and "You Blow Me Away".

In 1995 Palmer released a greatest hits album, which reached number 4 in the UK. Also in 1995 he reunited with other members of Power Station to record a second album. Bassist John Taylor eventually backed out of the project, to be replaced by Bernard Edwards. Palmer and the rest of the band completed the album Living in Fear (1996), and had just begun touring when Edwards died from pneumonia.

In 1997, Palmer performed with Rod Stewart at Wembley.

Personal life
Palmer met Sue, his future wife, at Slough railway station in 1969, attracted by her style (silver-coloured boots and matching mini-dress) and by the science-fiction book she was reading. They married two years later, and had two children. The family moved to New York City in the mid-1970s and then to the Bahamas a few years later. In 1987, Palmer and his family relocated to Lugano, Switzerland. The couple divorced in 1993.

A quiet man in his personal life, Palmer was uninterested in most of the excesses of the rock 'n' roll lifestyle, although he was a very heavy tobacco user who smoked as many as 60 cigarettes a day. While he hadn't lived in Yorkshire for many decades, in the last interview he gave, Palmer said that the region, and his father, had given him "a healthy work ethic, and a straight-forwardness".

Death
Palmer died from a heart attack in a Paris hotel room on 26 September 2003 at age 54. He had been in the French capital after recording a television appearance in London for Yorkshire TV, a retrospective titled My Kinda People. His long-term partner, Mary Ambrose, was not with him at his death. Among those who paid tribute were Duran Duran, stating: "He was a very dear friend and a great artist. This is a tragic loss to the British music industry." He was buried in Lugano, Switzerland.

Awards and nominations
{| class="wikitable sortable plainrowheaders" 
|-
! scope="col" | Award
! scope="col" | Year
! scope="col" | Nominee(s)
! scope="col" | Category
! scope="col" | Result
! scope="col" class="unsortable"| 
|-
! scope="row" rowspan=2|ASCAP Pop Music Awards
| 1986
| "Addicted to Love"
| rowspan=2|Most Performed Songs
| 
| 
|-
| 1990
| "Simply Irresistible"
| 
| 
|-
!scope="row" rowspan=5|Grammy Awards
| 1980
| "Bad Case of Loving You"
| Best Rock Vocal Performance, Male
| 
| rowspan=5|
|-
| rowspan=3|1987
| rowspan=3|"Addicted to Love"
| Song of the Year
| 
|-
| Record of the Year
| 
|-
|rowspan=2|Best Rock Vocal Performance, Male
| 
|-
| 1989
| "Simply Irresistible"
| 
|-
! scope="row" rowspan=6|MTV Video Music Awards
| rowspan=5|1986
| rowspan=5|"Addicted to Love"
| Video of the Year
| 
| rowspan=6|
|-
| Best Male Video
| 
|-
| Best Stage Performance in a Video
| 
|-
| Best Overall Performance
| 
|-
| Viewer's Choice
| 
|-
| 1987
| "I Didn't Mean to Turn You On"
| Best Male Video
| 
|-
!scope="row"|Pollstar Concert Industry Awards
| 1987
| Tour
| Small Hall Tour Of The Year
| 
|

Discography

Studio albums
 Sneakin' Sally Through the Alley (1974)
 Pressure Drop (1975)
 Some People Can Do What They Like (1976)
 Double Fun (1978)
 Secrets (1979)
 Clues (1980)
 Maybe It's Live (1982)  (Half studio tracks, half live)
 Pride (1983)
 Riptide (1985)
 Heavy Nova (1988)
 Don't Explain (1990)
 Ridin' High (1992)
 Honey (1994)
 Rhythm & Blues (1999)
 Drive (2003)

References

External links

 
 
 
 Complete discography
 BBC obituary

 
1949 births
2003 deaths
British expatriates in Switzerland
English rock singers
English pop singers
Blues rock musicians
English male singer-songwriters
English record producers
Island Records artists
British expatriates in the Bahamas
Grammy Award winners
People from Batley
People from Scarborough, North Yorkshire
The Power Station (band) members
British rhythm and blues boom musicians
Naturalised citizens of Switzerland
People from Lugano
20th-century English singers
The Alan Bown Set members
People educated at Scarborough High School for Boys
20th-century British male singers
Second British Invasion artists
Musicians from Yorkshire